Darwinia helichrysoides is a species of flowering plant in the myrtle family Myrtaceae and is endemic to a small area in south-west of Western Australia. It is a slender shrub with linear leaves and drooping heads of about 4 red and green flowers surrounded by many glabrous bracts.

Description
Flowering occurs from August to November.<ref name="Meisn.">{{cite journal |last1=Meisner |first1=Carl D.F. |title=On some new species of Chamaelauciae |journal=Journal of the Proceedings of the Linnean Society, Botany |date=1857 |volume=1 |pages=37–38 |url=https://www.biodiversitylibrary.org/item/8352#page/41/mode/1up |access-date=25 October 2022}}</ref>

Taxonomy
This species was first formally described in 1857 by Carl Meissner, who gave it the name Genetyllis helichrysoides in th Journal of the Proceedings of the Linnean Society, Botany, from specimens collected by James Drummond. In 1865, George Bentham changed the name to Darwinia helichrysoides in the Journal of the Proceedings of the Linnean Society, Botany. The specific epithet (helichrysoides ) means "Helichrysum-like".

Distribution and habitatDarwinia helichrysoides'' is found in the uplands in a small area between Coorow and Dandaragan where the Geraldton Sandplain meets the Swan Coastal Plain where it grows in gravelly lateritic soils.

References

 

helichrysoides
Endemic flora of Western Australia
Myrtales of Australia
Rosids of Western Australia
Plants described in 1857
Taxa named by Carl Meissner